John Matthew Sullivan (born February 25, 1963) is an American mathematician who works in Germany as a professor at the Technical University of Berlin. His research includes work on knot theory, constant-mean-curvature surfaces, mathematical foams, scientific visualization, and mesh generation.

Early life and education
Sullivan was born in Princeton, New Jersey, and graduated summa cum laude from Harvard University in 1985. He earned a master's degree from the University of Cambridge in 1986, and a doctorate from Princeton University in 1990 under the supervision of Frederick J. Almgren, Jr.

Career
After postdoctoral studies at The Geometry Center and the Mathematical Sciences Research Institute, Sullivan joined the faculty of the University of Illinois at Urbana–Champaign in 1997. He moved to Berlin in 2003, and chaired the Berlin Mathematical School from 2012 to 2014.

Awards
In 2012, he became one of the inaugural Fellows of the American Mathematical Society.

References

External links
 
 Website at TU Berlin
 Mathematical art gallery, 2010 Bridges conference

1963 births
Living people
People from Princeton, New Jersey
21st-century German mathematicians
Harvard University alumni
Alumni of the University of Cambridge
Princeton University alumni
University of Illinois Urbana-Champaign faculty
Academic staff of the Technical University of Berlin
Fellows of the American Mathematical Society
20th-century American mathematicians
21st-century American mathematicians
Mathematical artists